Yawhen Kapaw (Yevgeny Kapov; born 30 January 1977) is a retired Belarusian professional footballer. He spent his entire playing career in Dnepr Mogilev, having been playing for them from 1993 till 2012. After retirement, he stayed in Dnepr as an assistant coach.

Honours 
Dnepr-Transmash Mogilev
Belarusian Premier League champion: 1998

External links

1977 births
Living people
People from Rahachow
Belarusian footballers
Association football defenders
FC Dnepr Mogilev players
FC Dnepr Rogachev players
Belarusian football managers
FC Dnepr Mogilev managers
Sportspeople from Gomel Region